Bertram Gideon Bourchier (27 August 1884 – 27 February 1958) was an Australian rules footballer who played for the Geelong Football Club in the Victorian Football League (VFL).

Notes

External links 

1884 births
1958 deaths
Australian rules footballers from Victoria (Australia)
Geelong Football Club players
Australian Army personnel of World War II
Australian Army soldiers